The Slătinic is a right tributary of the river Motru in Romania. It flows into the Motru at Lunca Banului, near Strehaia.

References

Rivers of Romania
Rivers of Mehedinți County